Live Talk Show Taxi (also known as Live Talk Show TAXI or TAXI) is a 2014 South Korean talk show presented by Lee Young-ja and Oh Man-seok. It airs on tvN on Tuesdays at 24:20 (KST).

Presenter
 Lee Young-ja (September 2007 – December 2012, June 2014 – November 2017)
 Kim Chang-yeol (September 2007 – December 2008)
 Gong Hyung-jin (January 2009 – August 2012)
 Kim Gu-ra (September 2012 – May 2014)
 Jun Hyun-moo (October 2012 – July 2013)
 Hong Eun-hee (August 2013 – May 2014)
 Oh Man-seok (June 2014 – November 2017)

International versions

 Currently airing
 Upcoming season
 Ceased to air

Awards and nominations

References

External links
  

2007 South Korean television series debuts
2010s South Korean television series
Korean-language television shows
South Korean television talk shows
South Korean variety television shows
TVN (South Korean TV channel) original programming
Works about taxis